The Rumpler C.VI was a high-altitude reconnaissance aircraft used by the Germans during the First World War. The aircraft was designed, along with the C.VII, based on the previous success of high-altitude Zeppelins, from which the engine was also taken: the Maybach Mb.IVa high-altitude high-compression engine. To operate in thinner atmosphere, the aircraft also had a special carburetor and radiator. The radiator was half-sized to reduce weight.

References

Bibliography

C.VI
German military reconnaissance aircraft